"We All Follow Man United" was a single released by the English football team Manchester United in 1985. It reached number 10 in the UK Singles Chart.

References

1985 singles
Manchester United F.C. songs
Football songs and chants
1985 songs
Song articles with missing songwriters